The Bhendibazaar gharana is one of the vocal gharanas of Indian classical music, which originated in Bhendi Bazaar area of Mumbai in 1890.

History and features

The Bhendibazaar gharana was founded around 1890 by brothers Chhajju Khan, Nazir Khan and Khadim Hussain Khan in the Bhendi bazaar area of Mumbai. The features of this gharana include using 'aakaar' for presenting khyals in an open voice, with clear intonation, a stress on breath-control, singing long passages in a single breath, a preference for madhyalaya (medium tempo) and use of the well-known Merukhand or Khandmeru system for extended alaps. Chhajju Khan's son Aman Ali Khan and Anjanibai Malpekar, are well-known exponents of this gharana. Amir Khan's father Shahmir Khan belonged to this gharana and passed on the tradition to his son.

Prominent exponents

Fourth generation- Disciples of Aman Ali Khan (1888-1953)

 Pandit Shivkumar Shukla (1918-1998)

 Ramesh Nadkarni (1921–1995)
 T.D. Janorikar (1921-2006)

Fifth generation
 (Late)Neelatai Nagpurkar; (Late)Upendra Kamat; (Late)Mandakini Gadre; (Late)Pt. Jagannath 'Sangeetmurti' Prasad; Vasanti Sathe

Other disciples

 Disciples of Aman Ali Khan: Ashraf hussain
Lata Mangeshkar; Vasantrao Deshpande; Manna Dey

 Disciples of Anjanibai Malpekar:
Kumar Gandharva; Kishori Amonkar; Begum Akhtar; Naina Devi

 Disciples of Shivkumar Shukla
Pandit Dayanand Devgandharva, Manoj Patel, Vasanti Sathe, Mukund Vyas, Sangeeta Pandharpurkar, Anil Vaishnav, Dwarkanath Bhonsle, Pandit Ishwarvhandra, Subhash Desai, Neelam Yajnik, Mitalee singh, Kiran Shukla, and Chintan Patel

 Disciples of Navrang Nagpurkar:
Asha Bhosle; Jitendra Abhisheki; Suman Kalyanpur; Pankaj Udhas

References

External links
Website devoted to Bhendi Bazaar gharana
Bhendi Bazaar gharana at ITC Sangeet Research Academy

Vocal gharanas
Culture of Mumbai